In human anatomy, the extensor pollicis brevis is a skeletal muscle on the dorsal side of the forearm.  It lies on the medial side of, and is closely connected with, the abductor pollicis longus. The extensor pollicis brevis (EPB) belongs to the deep group of the posterior fascial compartment of the forearm.[1] It is a part of the lateral border of the anatomical snuffbox.

Structure 
The extensor pollicis brevis arises from the ulna distal to the abductor pollicis longus, from the interosseous membrane, and from the dorsal surface of the radius. 

Its direction is similar to that of the abductor pollicis longus, its tendon passing the same groove on the lateral side of the lower end of the radius, to be inserted into the base of the first phalanx of the thumb.

Variation 
Absence; fusion of tendon with that of the extensor pollicis longus or abductor pollicis longus muscle.

Function 
In a close relationship to the abductor pollicis longus, the extensor pollicis brevis both extends and abducts the thumb at the carpometacarpal and metacarpophalangeal joints.

Additional images

References

Sources

External links 

 PTCentral

Muscles of the upper limb